The ATI 425 Titanium Alloy is a titanium alloy developed and produced by Allegheny Technologies Incorporated (ATI).

It is produced in multiple product forms, including sheet, coil, strip, Precision Rolled Strip and foil, plate, seamless tube, shapes and rectangles, as well as castings.

The ATI 425 Titanium Alloy was debuted on June 14, 2010 at the land and air-land defense and security exhibition Eurosatory in Paris, France.

Applications

Markets for ATI 425 Alloy include aerospace, defense, industrial, medical and recreation. The corrosion resistance of the ATI 425 Alloy to saltwater environments also makes it a candidate for marine-related applications.

Specifically, the ATI 425 Alloy is designed for: 
 Wing sheets
 Defense rotor aircraft
 Ground vehicles
 Soldier support and protection
 Weapons systems
 Naval systems
 Boiler/pressure vessel applications
 Additional naval applications, including shiphold structural materials; armor; doors, hatches and bulkheads; and piping
 Golf clubs (Titleist TSI)

The ATI 425 Alloy was used on the Phoenix Mars Lander, which was launched on August 4, 2007.

Availability

The ATI 425 Alloy currently is available in the following forms:

Certifications

The ATI 425 Alloy sheet is processed to the AMS 6946 specification.

The ASME Board on Pressure Technology Codes and Standards (BPTCS) has approved ATI 425 Alloy for use in Section VIII, Div. 1 construction up to 600 °F (316 °C).

The ATI 425 Alloy has been assigned a titanium grade 38 by ASTM International. It can be welded using ERTi-38 weld wire, which is produced in accordance with AWS 5.16/A5.16M.

Notes

Titanium alloys